Liam Georgetown is an Australian former rugby league footballer who last played for the Boston 13s in the USA Rugby League. His position was usually on the wing or fullback.

Georgetown had previously played for the Penrith Panthers in the National Rugby League and holds the record for the most points at the Redcliffe Dolphins in the Queensland Cup.

References

1985 births
Living people
Australian rugby league players
Boston 13s players
Penrith Panthers players
Redcliffe Dolphins players
Rugby league fullbacks
Rugby league wingers
Rugby league players from Queensland